Barbora Brémová (born 24 August 1991 in Košice, Czechoslovakia) is a Slovakian ice hockey defender.

International career
Brémová was selected for the Slovakia national women's ice hockey team in the 2010 Winter Olympics. She played in all five games, but did not record a point. She played all three games of the qualifying campaigns for the 2010 and 2014 Olympics.

Brémová has also appeared for Slovakia at four IIHF Women's World Championships across two levels. Her first appearance came in 2008. She appeared in the top-level World Championships in 2011 and 2012.

She competed in one junior tournament for the Slovakia women's national under-18 ice hockey team, playing in Division I in 2009.

Career statistics

International career

References

External links
Eurohockey.com Profile
Sports-Reference Profile 

1991 births
Living people
Ice hockey players at the 2010 Winter Olympics
Olympic ice hockey players of Slovakia
Sportspeople from Košice
Slovak women's ice hockey defencemen
Universiade medalists in ice hockey
Universiade bronze medalists for Slovakia
Competitors at the 2011 Winter Universiade